Total Distortion is a 1995 full motion video adventure game for Mac and Windows, developed by Pop Rocket.

Gameplay
The gameplay has the player as a music video entrepreneur in the "Distortion Dimension", a place where they fight "Guitar Warriors" in guitar battles. The goal of the game is to get fame points, make money, and film successful music videos. The game was also known for its sense of humor; the famous game over screen featured the enemy singing a song called "You Are Dead". One of the most distinctive features of the game was the sleep mode. When player went to sleep, a dream appeared which consisted of a minigame. If the player failed the dream sequence it would result in a nightmare, which decreased mental energy (an important stat in the game).

Development
Originally slated for Q4 1993, the game was delayed until November 1995.

The programming of this game was headed up mostly by Joe Sparks, creator of Radiskull and Devil Doll and Spaceship Warlock.

Story
Six years before the player's journey to the Total Distortion Dimension began, an alien artifact was discovered by the U.S. government, who learned the technology was a transportation device that could teleport any object to any place in a single instant. The technology, however, was not perfect, with large objects requiring large amounts of power, and organic beings forced into a state of coma for six weeks upon using the device. After some time, the government discovered methods of safe dimensional travel. However, what they found next was quite shocking.

Rather than finding foreign alien life on other worlds, the teleportation technology took them to different realities of Earth where certain forms of Pop Culture flourished, ranging from cartoons and comics to genres of music, created from the dreaming minds of their youth. When the player's head producer died, his will entrusted the player with 3 million dollars. Given the stale state of pop culture on this Earth, the player sets out to the Total Distortion Dimension to bring back music videos to Earth.

Reception

It was critically acclaimed for being innovative and creative.

References

External links

Sparks, Joe. "Total Distortion: Awards", JoeSparks.com, 1997? 2007. Accessed June 26, 2007.
 Salon.com review
 GameSpot review

1995 video games
Adventure games
Full motion video based games
Classic Mac OS games
Music management games
Video games featuring protagonists of selectable gender
Video games developed in the United States
Video games about parallel universes
Windows games